Nimbia occlusa is a form of Ediacaran fossil shaped like a circular or oval disk, with a thick rim around the margin.  Within the rim the fossil is usually flat, but may have a central nipple or dimple.  These fossils were generally believed to be those of cnidarians, but they have since been reinterpreted as structures made by microbial colonies (Grazhdankin, see Ediacaran biota for references and discussion).  They can reach up to 6 cm in diameter, with a centimeter-thick rim.  Some fossils are distorted.

Nimbia occurs in numerous locations across a large range of time, which lends weight to theories that the fossil does not represent a single animal species.  It occurs in the Twitya Formation in the Mackenzie Mountains in Canada dated at 610 million years ago, near the end of the Marinoan glaciation, and in  rocks in Kazakhstan.  Aspidella also appears in these areas.  Morania and Beltina carbonaceous film fossils in the Twitya Formation are not considered to be animals.  Nimbia-like fossils have also been found in the Cambrian period.

See also
List of Ediacaran genera

References

External links
 Nimbia occlusa data sheet
 Locations of Ediacaran fossils, references

Ediacaran life
Cambrian life
Cryogenian life
Incertae sedis
Fossils of Norway